This is a list of some of the notable people either born or brought up in Jharkhand state, India.

Award winners

Padma Bhushan
Sailesh Kumar Bandopadhyay - 2010, Social Activist, Gandhian
Mahendra Singh Dhoni - 2018, Indian international cricketer who captained the Indian national team in limited-overs formats from 2007 to 2016 and in Test cricket from 2008 to 2014.
Kariya Munda - 2019,  Indian politician and the former Deputy Speaker of the 15th Lok Sabha

Padma Shri
 Shashadhar Acharya - 2020, Chhau dancer
Premlata Agarwal - 2013
Ashok Bhagat - 2015, social worker and secretary of Vikas Bharti
Makar Dhwaja Darogha - 2011, Chhau Dancer 
Mahendra Singh Dhoni - 2009, Indian international cricketer
Pandit Gopal Prasad Dubey - 2012, Chhau dancer and choreographer
Balbir Dutt - 2017, journalist
Girdhari Ram Gonjhu - 2022, Literature
Chutni Devi - 2021, social worker
Digamber Hansda - 2018
Madhu Mansuri Hasmukh - 2020, folk singer
Bulu Imam - 2019, activist
Deepika Kumari - 2016, sports, archery
Vasundhara Komkali - 2006, classical musician
Mukund Nayak - 2017, folk singer
Parasu Ram Mishra
Ram Dayal Munda - 2010, Indian scholar and regional music exponent
Simon Oraon - 2016, Indian environmentalist and social worker
Shyama Charan Pati - 2006, Chhau Dancer
Kedar Nath Sahoo - 2005, classical dancer
Jamuna Tudu - 2019, environmental activist

Sangeet Natak Akademi Award
Chetan Joshi, flautist
Mahavir Nayak, nagpuri folk singer
Mukund Nayak, folk artist

Jharkhand Gaurav Samman
Lal Vijay Shahdeo - 2019, Film Director, Producer & Writer

Nari Shakti Puraskar 
Chami Murmu - 2019, environmental activist

Academics
Bhuneshwar Anuj, scholar
Gerald Durrell - naturalist, zookeeper, conservationist, author and television presenter; born in Jamshedpur in 1925
Girdhari Ram Gonjhu - Literature and Scholar
Shravan Kumar Goswami, Professor and Scholar
Bisheshwar Prasad Keshari - educationist, writer, scholar
Shakuntala Mishra, Professor and writer
Ram Dayal Munda - former Vice-Chancellor of Ranchi University
Ram Krishna Singh - teacher of English language skills and Indian writing in English at Indian School of Mines, Dhanbad since 1976

Authors
 Miniya Chatterji, author
 Pankaj Dubey - author
 Aditi Gupta, author
 Bulu Imam - environmentalist, writer
 Shiv Khera - author, motivational speaker, activist
 Praful Kumar Rai, writer
 Nikita Singh - author
 Sahani Upendra Pal Singh, writer
 Khagendra Thakur

Bureaucrats
Subodh Kumar Jaiswal - Director of CBI (Central Bureau of Investigation)
Rajeev Topno - Private Secretary to the Prime Minister of India Narendra Modi; former Director of Prime Minister's office (PMO), New Delhi

Business and industry
Anurag Dikshit - born in Dhanbad, ranked 207 by Forbes among the world's richest people in 2006
Atul Kochhar - Indian-born, British based chef, restaurateur, and television personality
Mahesh Poddar - industrialist
Ashwin Srivastava - venture capitalist

Cinema and theatre

Actors
Krishna Bharadwaj (actor) - born in Ranchi
Bibhu Bhattacharya - born in Jharia
Meiyang Chang - born in Dhanbad
Dipankar De - born in Jamshedpur
Dinesh Deva - dancer and actor 
Adarsh Gourav - born in Jamshedpur
Raman Gupta - actor and dancer
Rajesh Jais - born in Ranchi
Sanjeev Jaiswal - born in Jamshedpur
Deepak Lohar, actor
R. Madhavan - born in Jamshedpur
Zeishan Quadri - actor and writer, born in Wasseypur
Bunty Singh, actor and dancer
Vikram Singh - actor and producer, born in Jamshedpur
Imran Zahid - born in Bokaro

Actresses
Pratyusha Banerjee - born in Jamshedpur
Priyanka Chopra - Miss World 2000, actress, born in Jamshedpur
Deeba - actress, born in Ranchi
Rasika Duggal - actress, born in Jamshedpur
Ishita Dutta - younger sister of Tanushree Dutta, born in Jamshedpur
Tanushree Dutta - Miss India 2004, actress, born in Jamshedpur
Auritra Ghosh - actress, born in Jamshedpur
Komal Jha - actress, born in Ranchi
Shweta Prasad - actress, born in Jamshedpur
Amrita Raichand - actress, born in Dhanbad
Anushka Sen, actress, born in Ranchi
Meenakshi Seshadri - Miss India 1981, born in Sindri
Eenu Shree - actress, born in Jamshedpur
Alisha Singh - actress, dancer and choreographer, born in Ranchi
Pooja Singh - born in Jamshedpur
Reecha Sinha - actress, born in Hazaribagh
Simone Singh - born in Jamshedpur
Supriya Kumari, actress
Sumann - born in Jamshedpur
Tania - Punjabi actress, born in Jamshedpur

Cinematographer / Choreographers
Aseem Mishra - cinematographer, born in Dhanbad
Alisha Singh - choreographer and actor, born in Ranchi

Directors / Producers
Imtiaz Ali - director and writer, Jamshedpur
Amit Bose - director, born in Jamshedpur
Sriram Dalton - director, born in Daltonganj
Raj Kumar Gupta - director, born in Hazaribag
Sanjivan Lal - director and writer, born in Jamshedpur
Akashaditya Lama - director and scriptwriter based in Bollywood, born in Ranchi
Prem Prakash Modi - director and writer, Dumka
Shomu Mukherjee - director, writer and producer, born in Jamshedpur
Lal Vijay Shahdeo - director, producer and writer based in Mumbai, born in Lohardaga
Gul Bahar Singh - director, born in Pakur 
Biju Toppo - director and producer, born in Mahuadanr

Music / playback singers / Lyricist / Poet
Karan Singh Arora - Indian singer, songwriter, rapper, music composer, music director, lyricist and model, Ranchi
Rajdeep Chatterjee - singer
Biswajit Roy Chowdhury - Hindustani classical musician and sarod player, Deoghar
Payal Dev - playback singer
Ronkini Gupta - playback singer, born in Jamshedpur 
Madhu Mansuri Hasmukh - folk singer, born in Ranchi
Chetan Joshi - flautist in the Hindustani classical music, Jharia
Govind Sharan Lohra - nagpuri folk singer
Monica Mundu - playback singer, also acted in film M.S. Dhoni: The Untold Story 
Nandlal Nayak - music composer
Shilpa Rao - singer, born in Jamshedpur
Chandan Tiwari - folk singer, Bokaro

Freedom fighters and revolutionaries 
Budhu Bhagat - freedom fighter 
Sheikh Bhikhari - freedom fighter in 1857 rebellion
Telanga Kharia - freedom fighter
Chanku Mahato- freedom fighter in Godda
Dhananjay Mahato - freedom fighter
Raghunath Mahato - freedom fighter
Tilka Majhi - freedom fighter
Birsa Munda - freedom fighter and folk hero; belonged to the tribal group of Munda people
Kanhu Murmu - leader of Santal revolt
Sido Murmu - leader of Santal revolt
Nilambar and Pitambar - freedom fighter
Jagabandhu Patnaik - freedom fighter
Pandey Ganpat Rai - freedom fighter in 1857 rebellion
Bakhtar Say - freedom fighter, fought against British force in 1812
Thakur Vishwanath Shahdeo - freedom fighter in 1857 rebellion
Ganga Narayan Singh - leader of Bhumij revolt
Mundal Singh - freedom fighter, fought against British force in 1812
Raghunath Singh - leader of Chuar revolt
Raja Arjun Singh - freedom fighter in 1857 rebellion
Ram Narayan Singh - freedom fighter
Tikait Umrao Singh - freedom fighter in 1857 rebellion

Journalism
Bhuneshwar Anuj, editor 
Dayamani Barla - journalist in Hindi newspaper Prabhat Khabar
Balbir Dutt - founder director and editor in chief of Hindi daily Deshpran.
Anjana Om Kashyap - executive editor of the Hindi news channel Aaj Tak

Jurists and Lawyers
Binod Bihari Mahato - lawyer, politician, political activist
Lal Pingley Nath Shahdeo - jurist and political activist
Lal Ranvijay Nath Shahdeo - lawyer, writer, political activist

Medical
Bharti Kashyap - ophthalmologist
Subhash Mukhopadhyay - created the world's second and India's first child using in-vitro fertilisation

Gallantry Awards winner
Rakesh Asthana
Albert Ekka - recipient of Param Vir Chakra
Randhir Prasad Verma - recipient of Ashoka Chakra

Poetry
Anuj Lugun - won the prestigious Bharat Bhushan Agarwal Award in 2011 for the best poem in Hindi
Ghasiram Mahli - Nagpuri poet
Lal Ranvijay Nath Shahdeo - Nagpuri poet
Raghunath Shah - Nagvanshi king and poet
Dalel Singh, poet
Ram Krishna Singh - published seventeen poetry collections in English

Politics

Activist
Surya Singh Besra - politician and activist
Binod Bihari Mahato - lawyer, politician, political activist 
Nirmal Mahto - political activist
Teklal Mahto - politician
Thakur Ji Pathak-indian activist, politician, businessman well know leader of Jharkhand(bihar)
Jaipal Singh Munda, hockey player and tribal leader
Kunal Sarangi - politician
Rudra Pratap Sarangi- politician and activist
Lal Ranvijay Nath Shahdeo - lawyer, writer, political activist
Shibu Soren - politician

Governors of other states
Bhishma Narain Singh - Assam, Tamil Nadu, Pondicherry, Andaman and Nicobar Islands
Rameshwar Thakur - Madhya Pradesh, Odisha, Karnataka, Andhra Pradesh

Chief Minister
Bhagwat Jha Azad - Chief Minister of Bihar from 14 February 1988 to 10 March 1989; born at Kasba village at Mehrama in Godda district
Raghubar Das - former chief minister of Jharkhand
Bindeshwari Dubey - Chief Minister of Bihar from 12 March 1985 to 14 February 1988; was involved in a Trade Union Movement in Chotanagpur collieries and industries since 1944; played an important role in the nationalization of collieries in India, specially in Jharkhand; was 6 term MLA from Bermo constituency in Bokaro District and MP from Giridih in Jharkhand
Binodanand Jha - Chief Minister of Bihar from February 1961 to October 1963
Madhu Koda - former chief minister of Jharkhand
Babulal Marandi - first Chief Minister of Jharkhand born in Giridih P.S Tisri P.O Chandouri
Arjun Munda - born in Jamshedpur, Union Minister of Tribal Affairs, Government of India.
Krishna Ballabh Sahay - ex-Chief Minister of Bihar
Hemant Soren - currently Chief Minister of Jharkhand
Shibu Soren - former chief minister of Jharkhand

Cabinet minister
Yadunath Baskey - Minister in Bihar Government
Satyanand Bhogta, minister of labour
Sudesh Kumar Mahto - former deputy chief minister 
Kariya Munda, former speaker of Loksabha
Vimla Pradhan, Former tourism minister
Dinesh Sarangi - First Health minister Jharkhand
Sanatan Sardar - Veteran tribal leader, former Irrigation Minister, Bihar and three-term MLA from Potka
Subodh Kant Sahay - former cabinet minister, government of India
Basant Narain Singh, Cabinet minister in Bihar
Jayant Sinha, Aviation minister
Yashwant Sinha - former Union Cabinet minister, Government of India

Other
Lobin Hembrom - politician
Ajoy Kumar - former Indian Police Service (IPS) officer; elected as the MP (Member of Parliament)
Bidyut Baran Mahato - MP from Jamshedpur
Shashank Manjari, member of Ramgarh Raj royal family and ex MLA from Dumri
Kartik Oraon, former member of Parliament
Sambit Patra - Politician and spokesperson of the Bharatiya Janata Party
Vijaya Raje, member of Ramgarh Raj royal family and ex MLA from Chatra
Ravindra Kumar Ray, former member of Parliament
Kunal Sarangi, politician
Lal Chintamani Sharan Nath Shahdeo, last Nagvanshi king and MLA from Ranchi
Kamakhya Narain Singh, King of Ramgarh Raj and politician

Religion
Thakur Anukulchandra
Father Kamil Bulke
Parshvanatha - twenty-third Tirthankara of Jainism
Telesphore Toppo

Rulers
Bairisal, Nagvanshi king in 16th century
Udai Pratap Nath Shah Deo, Nagvanshi king in 20th century
Bhim Karn, Nagvanshi king in 12th century
Pratap Karn, Nagvanshi king in 15th century
Shivdas Karn, Nagvanshi king in 14th century
Gajghat Rai, Nagvanshi king in 9th century
Phani Mukut Rai, first Nagvanshi king
Medini Ray, King of Palamu in 17th century
Durjan Shah, Nagvanshi king in 17th century
Dripnath Shah, Nagvanshi king in 18th century
Madhu Karn Shah, Nagvanshi king in 16th century
Raghunath Shah, Nagvanshi king in 17th century
Ram Shah, Nagvanshi king in 17th century
Ani Nath Shahdeo, king of Barkagarh
Lal Chintamani Sharan Nath Shahdeo, last Nagvanshi king
Thakur Vishwanath Shahdeo, King of Barkagarh
Baghdeo Singh, first king of Ramgarh Raj
Dalel Singh, king of Ramgarh in 17th century
Jagatpal Singh, king of Pithuriya
Kamakhya Narain Singh, king of Ramgarh
Mukund Singh, king of Ramgarh
Raja Arjun Singh, King of Porahat
Tikait Umrao Singh, king of Ormanjhi

Social service
 Jyoti Dhawale
 Ishwar Chandra Vidyasagar - 19th Century Indian educator and social reformer

Sports

Archery
Komalika Bari 
Mangal Singh Champia - Indian archer, who won multiple medals in several International event, including Asian Games.
Deepika Kumari - Indian athlete who competes in archery status, currently ranked number 1 in the world.
Madhumita Kumari - won the Silver Medal Asian Games 2018 in the Women's compound archery team event.
Laxmirani Majhi
Purnima Mahato - won the Indian national archery championships and a silver medal at the 1998 Commonwealth Games.

Boxing
Anthresh Lalit Lakra - international boxer
Aruna Mishra - 2004 world champion
Diwakar Prasad - international boxer
Birju Shah - international boxer
Selay Soy - boxer

Cricket
Varun Aaron
Kirti Azad
Rajesh Chauhan
Kumar Deobrat
Mahendra Singh Dhoni
Ishank Jaggi
Monu Kumar
Kumar Kushagra
Shahbaz Nadeem
Shubhlakshmi Sharma - Indian female cricket player
Pratyush Singh - made his first-class debut for Jharkhand in the 2016–17 Ranji Trophy on 20 October 2016.
Randhir Singh
Utkarsh Singh
Virat Singh
Saurabh Tiwary
Rahul Tripathi

Association football
Sanjay Balmuchu - Indian footballer, plays as a midfielder for Churchill Brothers S.C. in the I-League; 2012 graduate of the Tata Football Academy
Lal Mohan Hansda - Indian footballer, plays as a forward for Prayag United S.C. in the I-League
Munmun Lugun - Indian footballer, plays as a defender for Pune in the I-League
Deepak Mondal

Hockey
Kanti Baa
Sylvanus Dung Dung - former field hockey player from India
Michael Kindo
Sangita Kumari
Bimal Lakra
Birendra Lakra - born in Simdega
Jaipal Singh Munda - captained the Indian field hockey team to win gold in the 1928 Summer Olympics in Amsterdam
Nikki Pradhan
Pushpa Pradhan
Masira Surin
Sumrai Tete
Manohar Topno

Lawn bowls
Lovely Choubey
Rupa Rani Tirkey

Mountaineering
Premlata Agarwal - mountain climber; on May 21, 2011, became the oldest Indian woman to summit Mount Everest, at age 45 
Binita Soren - mountain climber; on May 26, 2012, became the first tribal woman to summit Mount Everest, at age 25

Others
Rameesh Kailasam - governance reform and policy expert from India

References 

Jharkhand
 
People